Elsamed Ramaj (born 26 April 1996) is an Albanian professional footballer who plays as a left winger for German club Alemannia Aachen.

Club career
Born in Albania, Ramaj was initially active for FC Iserlohn in his youth before playing for Wuppertaler SV in the A-Junior Bundesliga in the 2014–15 season. In the second half of the season he was used four times on the first team, playing in the Oberliga Niederrhein. He then moved to Westfalia Rhynern in the Oberliga Westfalen. There he was used five times in the first half of the season before he left the club and joined SV Hohenlimburg. After a season at TSG Sprockhövel in the Oberliga, Ramaj moved to Regionalliga club 1. FC Kaan-Marienborn for the 2018–19 season, for whom he scored ten goals in 31 games. He was the top scorer in his team, but they were relegated back to the Oberliga at the end of the season.

For the 2019–20 season, Ramaj moved to 3. Liga club FC Hansa Rostock. He made his professional debut for Hansa Rostock in the 3. Liga on 20 July 2019, coming on as a substitute in the 84th minute for Pascal Breier in the away match against Viktoria Köln, which finished as a 3–3 draw. After four league appearances (3 times from the start) and five appearances (four goals) on the second team in the Oberliga Nordost, he was loaned out to Regionalliga Nord club VfB Lübeck on 20 January 2020 until the end of the season. After the winter break, he was used in all four games (once from the start) until the season ended due to the COVID-19 pandemic and scored one goal. VfB Lübeck was declared champions and was promoted to the 3. Liga. At the end of June 2020 he agreed with Hansa Rostock to terminate his contract, which ran until June 2021 and signed a new contract with VfB Lübeck with a term until 30 June 2021.

References

External links
 
 

1996 births
Living people
German people of Albanian descent
German footballers
Albanian footballers
Association football wingers
Wuppertaler SV players
TSG Sprockhövel players
1. FC Kaan-Marienborn players
FC Hansa Rostock players
VfB Lübeck players
Kickers Offenbach players
Alemannia Aachen players
3. Liga players
Regionalliga players